Nariman is an ancient Persian name meaning "faith and brightness."  He is the son of Gershasp, and father of Sām who himself is grandfather of Rostam the hero (Rostam's Father was Zal).

Nariman in Shahnameh
Nariman was reported in Shahnameh at the time of Fereydun. According to the Shahnameh, Nariman was one of Fereydun allies during the reign of Fereydun. Nariman perished in the war that led to the siege of a fortress on Mount Sepand. This story is told by Zāl for Rostam to persuade him  Nariman revenge on the inhabitants of the castle.

References

Sources
Ferdowsi Shahnameh. From the Moscow version. Mohammed Publishing.

External links

Shahnameh characters
Shahnameh stories